Regenerative cooling is a method of cooling gases in which compressed gas is cooled by allowing it to expand and thereby take heat from the surroundings. The cooled expanded gas then passes through a heat exchanger where it cools the incoming compressed gas.

Regenerative cycles
Stirling cycle
Gifford–McMahon cycle
Vuilleumier cycle
Pulse tube refrigerator

History
In 1857, Siemens introduced the regenerative cooling concept with the Siemens cycle.  In 1895, William Hampson in England and Carl von Linde in Germany independently developed and patented the Hampson–Linde cycle to liquefy air using the Joule–Thomson expansion process and regenerative cooling. On 10 May 1898, James Dewar used regenerative cooling to become the first to statically liquefy hydrogen.

See also
Cryocooler
Displacer
Fluid mechanics
Regenerative cooling (rocket)
Regenerative heat exchanger
Thermodynamic cycle
Timeline of hydrogen technologies

References

External links
Regenerative Coolers
 Regenerative Cycle Video

Cooling technology
Cryogenics
Thermodynamic cycles
Industrial gases
ja:潜熱#再生冷却